Marek Dolezaj (born 13 April 1998) is a Slovak professional basketball player. He played college basketball for the Syracuse Orange.

Early life and career
Dolezaj was born in Bratislava, the son of Milos Dolezaj, a banker, and Ladislava, a professor. His older sister played volleyball. Dolezaj grew up playing soccer but first began playing basketball at the age of seven after a coach suggested it. He studied at the Gymnázium Hubeného in Bratislava. Dolezaj joined MBK Karlovka Bratislava of the Extraliga in 2014, and averaged 2.1 points and 1.1 rebounds per game. He signed with Club Baloncesto El Olivar of the Spanish LEB Plata in October 2015. He put videos of himself playing basketball on YouTube, which attracted the attention of Syracuse assistant coach Adrian Autry. Autry eventually came to Bratislava to recruit Dolezaj. During the 2016-17 season, he played for MBK Karlovka Bratislava and averaged 11.7 points and 4.2 rebounds per game. In May 2017, he committed to play college basketball at Syracuse.

College career
As a freshman, Dolezaj started the final 17 games of the season and averaged 5.8 points and 4.8 rebounds per game, helping the team reach the NCAA Tournament's Sweet 16. He averaged 4.1 points and 3.5 rebounds per game as a sophomore, starting six games. On February 1, 2020, Dolezaj scored a career-high 22 points in a 97-88 loss to Duke. As a junior, he averaged 10.4 points and 6.4 rebounds per game. Dolezaj was slowed by a broken finger as a senior. He chipped his tooth in a game against Georgetown on January 9, 2021. Dolezaj averaged 9.8 points, 5.1 rebounds, and 3.3 assists per game, helping the Orange advance to the NCAA tournament's Sweet 16. He finished his career with 960 points and 649 rebounds. Dolezaj declined to accept the NCAA's additional year of eligibility granted due to the COVID-19 pandemic, instead entering the 2021 NBA draft.

Professional career
On August 17, 2021, Dolezaj signed with BC Ternopil of the Ukrainian Basketball SuperLeague. He averaged 9.8 points, 3.5 rebounds, 1.9 assists and 1.1 steals per game. 

On January 13, 2022, Dolezaj signed with Iraklis of the Greek Basket League. In 13 games, he averaged 4 points and 3.7 rebounds in 23 minutes per contest.

National team career
Dolezaj has represented Slovakia in several international competitions. He participated in the 2015 FIBA Europe Under-18 Championship Division B, averaging 9.1 points, 9 rebounds and 4 assists per game despite being younger than most players. Dolezaj posted a triple double of 11 points, 12 rebounds and 10 assists against Ireland. In the 2016 FIBA U18 European Championship Division B, he led the team in scoring and rebounding with 13.4 points, 9.4 rebounds and 1.9 assists per game. Dolezaj averaged 11 points, 6.4 rebounds, and 2.4 assists in the 2018 FIBA U20 European Championship Division B qualifiers.

References

External links

Syracuse Orange bio

1998 births
Iraklis Thessaloniki B.C. players
Living people
Power forwards (basketball)
Sportspeople from Bratislava
Slovak expatriate sportspeople in Greece
Slovak expatriate basketball people in Spain
Slovak expatriate basketball people in the United States
Slovak men's basketball players
Syracuse Orange men's basketball players